The Rawal Bhil are a clan of the Bhil ethnic community and are found in the state of Rajasthan, India.

Social status
, the Rawal Bhil were classified as a Scheduled Tribe under the Indian government's reservation program of positive discrimination.

References

Scheduled Tribes of Rajasthan
Bhil clans